The 2020–21 Summit League men's basketball season began with practices in October 2020, followed by the start of the 2020–21 NCAA Division I men's basketball season in November. Conference play began in January 2021 and will conclude in March 2021.

Membership changes
The conference both gained and lost a member after the 2019–20 season. Purdue Fort Wayne left for the Horizon League and was replaced by Kansas City, which returned to the Summit after a seven-year absence spent in the Western Athletic Conference.

Preseason awards
Preseason awards were announced by the league office on October 26, 2020.

Preseason men's basketball coaches poll

Preseason All-Summit League teams

Conference matrix

All-Summit League awards

Summit League men's basketball weekly awards

References